Sherlock Holmes: The Breath of God is a Sherlock Holmes pastiche novel by Guy Adams, originally published in 2011.

The novel is an account of a mystery involving the supernatural deaths of people. In the course of his investigation, Holmes meets Aleister Crowley and William Hope Hodgson's supernatural detective Thomas Carnacki.

Reception
Peter Coleborn writing for the British Fantasy Society called it "well written, engrossing and effective". The Daily Rotation claimed "the book has a crisp wit, high adventure, knowing nods to literary fans, and a well plotted mystery".

Publishers Weekly, however, was more mixed saying "Holmes's hyper-rationalism never gels with the decidedly otherworldly plot line, though Adams does a better-than-average job in portraying him and Watson".

References

External links
Guy Adams

2011 British novels
Sherlock Holmes novels
Sherlock Holmes pastiches
Titan Books titles